Let's Talk is a 2015 comedy-drama film written, directed and starring Sergio Rubini. It is based on his theatre play Provando... Dobbiamo parlare. It premiered at the 2015 Rome Film Festival.

Plot 
Vanni and Linda have been engaged for ten years, they live together in a penthouse in central Rome. He is a writer, she is his ghostwriter. Their best friends are Costanza and Alfredo, known as Prof. Two doctors, she is a dermatologist and he is a heart surgeon in love with his job. They are married, have no children and manage their marriage like a business company.

Costanza suddenly discovers that Prof. has a lover, and in the throes of a panic attack, she bursts into the home of Vanni and Linda. Thus begins the longest night for the four protagonists who, between quarrels, jokes, laughter and admissions of guilt, will put their loves and friendships at stake.

Cast 

Sergio Rubini as Vanni
Isabella Ragonese as Linda
Fabrizio Bentivoglio as Alfredo
Maria Pia Calzone as Costanza

See also 
 List of Italian films of 2015

References

External links 

2015 comedy-drama films
Italian comedy-drama films
2010s Italian-language films
2010s Italian films